John Keats (1795-1821) was an English poet.

Keats may also refer to:

Places
 Keats Island (British Columbia), Canada
 Keats Island (Newfoundland and Labrador), Canada
 Keats, Kansas, an unincorporated community in the United States
 Keats (crater), a crater on Mercury

Other uses
 Keats (surname)
 HMS Keats (K482), a British frigate in service in the Royal Navy from 1943 to 1946
 Keats (band), a British rock band of 1983-1984

People with the given name
 Keats Lester (1904-1946), British tennis player

See also
 Keat, a surname
 Keats' House, home of poet John Keats